The 2017 United States Mixed Doubles Curling Championship was held from March 2–5 at the Four Seasons Curling Club in Blaine, Minnesota. Matt Hamilton and Becca Hamilton won the tournament, earning the right to represent the United States at the 2017 World Mixed Doubles Curling Championship in Lethbridge, Canada.

Teams 
Twelve teams qualified to compete in the championship. Six of the teams were automatically qualified and the remaining six teams made it into the tournament by being the top teams in a 22 team qualifying round held at Curl Mesabi in January 2017.

Round robin

Standings

Tiebreakers

Pool A 
Saturday, March 4, 12:00 noon ET

Saturday, March 4, 4:00pm ET

Pool B 
Saturday, March 4, 12:00 noon ET

Saturday, March 4, 4:00pm ET

Playoffs 
The playoffs consisted of a 6-team bracket with the top two teams receiving byes in the quarterfinals.

Bracket

Quarterfinals 
Saturday, March 4, 8:00pm ET

Semifinals 
Sunday, March 5, 9:00am ET

Finals 
Sunday, March 5, 1:00pm ET

References 

United States National Curling Championships
Curling in Minnesota
Curling, United States Mixed Doubles
Curling, United States Mixed Doubles
Curling, United States Mixed Doubles
Sports in Blaine, Minnesota
2017 in sports in Minnesota
United States